Gaetano Martino (25 November 1900 – 21 July 1967) was an Italian politician, physician, and university teacher.

Early life and medicine
Gaetano Martino was born in 1900 in Messina, Sicily, son of its Mayor Antonino Martino. He graduated in medicine to the Sapienza University of Rome in 1923. He worked as physician for Saint-Antoine Hospital in Paris. In 1934, he became teacher to the University of Messina, and later was also dean of the University from 1943 to 1954. From 1966 to 1967, Martino was also dean of the Sapienza University of Rome.

Political career

Foreign Minister

Martino was a prominent Liberal politician. He was elected in 1948 to the Chamber of Deputies, becoming briefly Minister of Public Education in 1954, under Christian Democrat Mario Scelba. In the late 1954, Martino became Minister of Foreign Affairs after the replacement of Attilio Piccioni, involved in the Montesi Affair. He maintained his Ministry also during the Antonio Segni's Cabinet (1954-1957), but was finally removed from office by new Prime Minister Adone Zoli.

As Minister of Foreign Affairs, Martino promoted a better European integration and internationalism, first with the Messina Conference in 1955.
In 1956, he obtained the Italian acceptance to the United Nations. In the same year Martino, along with Halvard Lange from Norway and Lester Pearson from Canada, became a "sage" of the NATO, promoting its involvement in civil areas.
Martino also attended the Treaty of Rome in 1957, establishing the European Economic Community.

Armoire's affair

In 1956, the newspaper La Repubblica published an article where Martino said that investigations on the German war crimes in Italy during World War II would have a negative impact on the Germany's integration in Europe, like an internal disapprove of the NATO. In 1994, with discovery in a military base of an armoire with secret documents on Nazi war crimes in Italy, nickname "Armoire of Shame" ("Armadio della Vergogna"), emerged that Martino blocked the investigations to avoid a German isolation during Cold War.

Later life
For his role in the European integration, Martino was elected President of the European Parliament in 1962. He also continued to serve as Deputy in the Italian Chamber until his death on July 1967.

References

External links

 

1900 births
1967 deaths
Politicians from Messina
Italian Liberal Party politicians
Foreign ministers of Italy
Education ministers of Italy
Italian Ministers of Defence
Candidates for President of Italy
Members of the Constituent Assembly of Italy
Deputies of Legislature I of Italy
Deputies of Legislature II of Italy
Deputies of Legislature III of Italy
Deputies of Legislature IV of Italy
Presidents of the European Parliament
Italian Liberal Party MEPs
MEPs for Italy 1958–1979
Grand Crosses 1st class of the Order of Merit of the Federal Republic of Germany
Sapienza University of Rome alumni
20th-century Italian physicians